Ana María Vignoli or Ana Maria Vignoli (born 27 July 1945) is an Uruguayan former minister of Social Development.

Life
Vignoli was born in Montevideo in 1945. During the dictatorship she was exiled in 1973 and she lived in Sweden until 1984.

In March 2010 she became the Minister of Social Development after she was appointed by President José Mujica. He and Vignoli are members of the Broad Front political party. The following July she was replaced by Daniel Olesker.

References

1945 births
Living people
People from Montevideo
Government ministers of Uruguay
Women government ministers of Uruguay
21st-century Uruguayan women politicians
21st-century Uruguayan politicians
Uruguayan expatriates in Sweden